Wheeler Islands are bar islands in Fayette County, West Virginia (USA) on the Kanawha River. The islands lie to the south of Longacre and to the north of Boomer.

See also 
List of islands of West Virginia

River islands of West Virginia
Landforms of Fayette County, West Virginia